The Young Friends Society of African Diasporan Institutions (YFS) exists to support, serve and promote African Diasporan cultural, historical, economic, educational, and community-based institutions through fundraising, event planning, educational and social programming. YFS also serves as a vehicle to promote networking opportunities and leadership development among its members to further strengthen the communities where these institutions are located. YFS is composed of individuals in their twenties, thirties and forties.

African diasporan institutions
African Diasporan Institutions are cultural, historic, educational, and economic institutions and organizations that are located in cities around the world that have large populations of people African descent. These institutions include but are not limited to museums, historical societies, theatre companies, dance companies, libraries and archives and performing arts groups.

YFS history
YFS began as an auxiliary group at the African American Museum of Philadelphia (AAMP). While working as the educational coordinator at AAMP, Shantrelle P. Lewis witnessed a lack of young adult visitors. Following in the tradition of other arts and cultural organizations, Lewis developed a plan to attract a younger demographic that could inject a new energy into the museum.  YFS held its inaugural event, Soul Simpatico, in October 2005, and within a year it had brought in 100 new members to AAMP.

As the organization grew, it became apparent that similar institutions in Philadelphia needed innovative ways to engage young adults looking for alternatives to the conventional nightlife scene of clubs and bars. In January 2007, YFS incorporated as a Pennsylvania non-profit organization and secured 501(c)3 status by June of the same year. Over the next two years, YFS partnered with various cultural organizations in Philadelphia, grew its membership base and held several successful events. YFS also started chapters in New Orleans and New York City, with plans to expand domestically and internationally.

Vision of YFS

1) Institution Building: YFS will help to ensure the survival and growth of important institutions. Through the development of a young core of members, supporters and sponsors, YFS will assist in sustaining African Diasporan Institutions for future generations. Each YFS chapter will invite up to 7 institutions in its geographic area to become a partner institution. These institutions will receive direct support and benefits as a partner institution of the Young Friends Society.

2) Cross-cultural association: Over the next decade, YFS will establish chapters in major cities around the African Diaspora. This will serve as a link between the various people and cultures that exist within the African World. It serves to educate people about the similarities and variations of people of African descent. Chapters will be established in the U.S., Caribbean, South America, Europe and the Continent of Africa.

3) Individual Support: YFS serves as a major catalyst for leadership development and interaction amongst like-minded individuals who are passionate about achieving their own unique potential and developing a global society. Unlike other networking forums that tend to serve individuals from a narrow demographic, YFS will bridge positive young people from diverse socio-economic, political, cultural, intellectual and religious backgrounds to support culture. In the process, it will also provide support for its members and their respective endeavors.

Past YFS events
Black and White Affair: The Harlem Renaissance Revisited
R.E.D. Affair: Welcome to Storyville
Shootout: A Photography Exhibition
Soul Simpatico
W.E.B. DuBois Lecture Series
Wines of the World
YFS Fest

See also

 List of topics related to the Black Diaspora
 African diaspora
 African and Black Diaspora
 African Diaspora Archaeology Newsletter
 Africana womanism
 African-American history
 Afro Americans in the Americas
 Africans
 African American
 Australians of African descent
 African immigration to the United States
 Afro-Latino
 Black People
 Black Hispanic
 Afro-Brazilian
 Afro-Puerto Rican
 Afro-Trinidadian
 Afro-Jamaicans
 Afro-Arab
 Afro-Belizean
 Garinagu
 Afro-Colombian and Raizal
 Afro-Cuban
 Afro-Ecuadorian
 Afro-German
 Indo-African (disambiguation)
 Afro-Irish
 Italians of African descent
 Afro-Mexican
 Afro-Peruvian
 Afro-Turks
 Black British
 Afro-Guyanese
 Black Canadian
 Afro-European
 Afro-French
 Black people in Ireland
 Afro-Russians
 Beta Israel
 Capoid
 Chagossians
 Dougla
 Negroid
 Siddi (Black African community in South Asia)

References

External links 
  The Young Friends Society of African Diasporan Institutions official website
  YouTube: "Young Friends Society Of Philadelphia Presents YFS Fest 2008"
  YFSFest = Janelle Monáe, ?uestlove + Zap Mama
  Museum of African American Art celebrates grand reopening

Non-profit organizations based in Philadelphia
African-American arts organizations
Arts organizations based in Pennsylvania
501(c)(3) organizations